New Lake is located northwest of Harrisburg, New York. Fish species present in the lake are white sucker, and black bullhead. There is carry down trail access.

References

Lakes of New York (state)
Lakes of Warren County, New York